The Northern Norway Line is a proposed railway which would be built through Northern Norway. Several proposals have been launched; one is to connect from the Nordland Line at Fauske and continue onwards to Narvik, Tromsø and Harstad. The Troms Line is a more limited proposal, which calls for a line between Narvik and Tromsø, but which would not connect to the rest of the railway network in Norway and instead the Swedish railway network via the Ofoten Line. During the Second World War, the German occupation forces started building the Polar Line between Fauske and Narvik, but that was abandoned after the war.

2019 study
In 2019 the Norwegian Railway Directorate signed an agreement with Asplan Viak to study the development of a line from Fauske via Narvik to Tromsø. The Fauske – Tromsø Line would be around 375km long, while the Bjerkvik – Harstad line would be just over 80km long. The study has two suggested routes, one with a lot of tunnels, and one with fewer tunnels. The former has a  tunnel and the latter 9 bridges over  length. Both have suspension bridges of over 1000 m span, near world record for railway bridges. The analyses found the full scheme development would cost NKr 113bn, while the line to Harstad would cost around NKr 20bn. The analysis showed that it would cost more than NKr 100bn ($US 11.6bn). However, the Norwegian Railway Directorate says the line will not be economically viable, as calculations show a net loss for the state of between NKr 46bn and NKr 109bn.

References 

Proposed railway lines in Norway
Rail transport in Nordland
Transport in Troms